Hari Hara Veera Mallu is an upcoming Indian Telugu-language period action adventure film written and directed by Krish Jagarlamudi. Depicting the life of legendary outlaw Veera Mallu, the film stars Pawan Kalyan in the titular role alongside Nidhhi Agerwal, Bobby Deol, Nargis Fakhri And Vikramjeet Virk.
. The story is set in 17th century under the backdrop of Mughal Empire.

The film began its production in September 2020 with filming taking place primarily in Hyderabad. The film's release is deferred multiple times as production experienced delays due to the COVID-19 pandemic in addition to Kalyan's other film and political commitments.

Premise
Set in the Mughal Era, outlaw Veera Mallu is tasked with the job of stealing the Koh-i-Noor diamond from the Mughals.

Cast
 Pawan Kalyan as Veera Mallu
 Nidhhi Agerwal as Panchami
 Bobby Deol as Aurangzeb
 Nargis Fakhri as Roshanara 
 Vikramjeet Virk as Mirza Khan
 Adithya Menon 
 Pujita Ponnada as a dancer item number in a song

Production

Development
In September 2019, producer A. M. Rathnam approached Pawan Kalyan, who semi-retired from films to pursue a career in politics, to star in a film directed by Krish Jagarlamudi. Later in November, Jagarlamudi narrated Kalyan the script of a period film in which he would play a thief. Kalyan accepted the film in principle and underwent a look test in January 2020. The film was launched in the same month in Hyderabad at Rathnam's office. It was tentatively titled PSPK 27, intended to be Kalyan's 27th film as a lead actor.

In September 2020, Jagarlamudi officially confirmed through his Twitter account that a period film has been in production, marking the first collaboration between Jagarlamudi and Kalyan. The film is set in 17th century with the backdrop of Mughals and Qutb Shahis. Several titles including Virupaksha, Hara Hara Mahadeva and Hari Hara Veeramallu were considered. In March 2021, the film's title is confirmed as Hari Hara Veera Mallu.

Pre-production
The film is produced under Rathnam's production banner Mega Surya Production. The film's score and soundtrack are composed by M. M. Keeravani. Gnana Shekar V. S. is signed as the cinematographer. Sai Madhav Burra is signed to write the film's dialogues. Ben Lock, who has supervised the graphic work in films like Aquaman, Warcraft, Star Wars: The Force Awakens is in charge of the VFX of this film.

Casting
The film was set to mark the Telugu debut of Hindi film actor Arjun Rampal who will be playing the role of the Mughal Emperor Aurangzeb. However, he was replaced by Bobby Deol as Rampal dropped out the film due to other commitments. Deol joined the production in December 2022.

Actress Nidhhi Agerwal is cast in the role of Panchami, opposite Kalyan. In March 2021, Jacqueline Fernandez was signed to play a crucial role in the film. However, Fernandez opted out of the project due to scheduling conflicts and she was replaced by Nargis Fakhri in December 2021. Fakhri plays Mughal empress Roshanara, Aurangzeb's sister.

Filming

In September 2020. Jagarlamudi completed a 15-day shooting schedule with Kalyan before it was halted due to the COVID-19 pandemic. The shooting was resumed in January 2021 in Hyderabad. Rampal joined the production in February 2021. The production has set up historical monuments Charminar, Red Fort and Machilipatnam port for the film. The shoot was suspended in April 2021 due to the COVID-19 pandemic.

Shooting of the film experienced delays due to Kalyan's other film commitments, namely, Bheemla Nayak. In December 2021, art director Rajeevan was replaced by Anand Sai, who began working on the film's sets. A new schedule where a major part of the film would be shot was expected to begin in January 2022 but delayed. Filming resumed in April 2022 with Kalyan joining the production. Nearly 60 percent of the shoot was completed by September 2022. 

Filming resumed on last week of October 2022. A large set is erected at Ramoji Film City for this purpose, with a crew of over 900 people.

Release
Hari Hara Veera Mallu  was initially slated for worldwide release on 14 January 2022 coinciding with Sankranti. However, in September 2021, the release date was rescheduled as 29 April 2022. However, it was postponed due to delays caused by the pandemic and Kalyan's political commitments. Later, in August 2022, A. M. Ratnam announced that the film was tentatively planned to release on 30 March 2023. However, it was delayed again due to Kalyan remained unavailable due to his political commitments. 

The film is planned to be released in Telugu along with dubbed versions in Hindi, Tamil, Malayalam and Kannada.

References

External links
 

Cultural depictions of Aurangzeb
Films directed by Krish
Films scored by M. M. Keeravani
Films set in ancient India
Films set in Andhra Pradesh
Films set in Delhi
Films set in Hyderabad, India
Films set in the 17th century
Indian action adventure films
Indian epic films
Indian historical action films
Mughal Empire in fiction
Upcoming films
Upcoming Indian films
Upcoming Telugu-language films